And in the Third Year, He Rose Again is a 1980 Spanish comedy film directed by Rafael Gil.
It is based on a best-selling novel by Fernando Vizcaíno Casas.

Plot
On the morning of 20 November 1978 (20-N), an elderly man in a coat resembling Francisco Franco in his last years hitchhikes from the Valley of the Fallen to Madrid.
Around the same time, a radio report on the French franc is misunderstood as saying that dictator Francisco Franco has rosen from the dead.
The rest of the film are scenes showing how Spanish people react to the rumor amidst the Spanish transition to democracy:
 Communist leader Santiago Carrillo dons a wig again and plans for exile.
 The Organization of Iberian States meets to end up amending the FIFA rules to allow football penalties to be decided democratically by the crowd.
 A festival attended by openly gay men is fled by them.
 Farmers are protesting for the situation of tomato production. They plan to take their protest to the Ministry of Agriculture in Madrid, but nobody will hear them and their cars are seized by the police.
 A union committee try to find a free date for a strike against the infidelity of the wife of one of the unionist with a rightist.
 During the shooting of a pornographic film involving bestiality, the producers renounce their career during Francoism.
 An industrialist is driven to a business meeting. Terrorist bombs and holdups happen along the way. On arrival, the company is full of strikers. At the meeting, an absurdist exchange of worthless shares is shown.
 A theater diva rehearses a pro-Communist play. Upon hearing the rumor, she and the director remind their past productions of José María Pemán's plays.
 Socialist leader Felipe González asks a plane to exile in France.
 Two prostitutes rejoice after their work is unionized.
 President of the government Adolfo Suárez dismisses the rumor and laments that Franco's expertise would be useful now. He takes out his old Movimiento Nacional uniform.
 In the village of Rebollar de la Mata, the modernist priest and the mayor play cards. An army column returning from an exercise has to divert into the village. The priest recovers his pre-Council vests and all the villagers welcome the surprised military with old flags.
 A rally at Plaza de Oriente in homage to Franco becomes a massive event. Several of the earlier characters cheer enthusiastically in Francoist paraphernalia. All timidly wait for an appearance of Franco from the balcony of Palacio de Oriente.
Next day, the elderly man is alone in the empty square.
At nearby Plaza de España, another elderly man recognizes that the future belongs to the younger and laments that the work of the old generation is not acknowledged anymore.
The elderly Franco hitchhikes back to the Valley of the Fallen.

Cast

See also
Look Who's Back (film), a 2015 German film based in a book about the resurrection of Adolf Hitler.

Notes

References

External links

1980 comedy films
Spanish comedy films
Films directed by Rafael Gil
Films scored by Gregorio García Segura
1980s Spanish-language films
1980s Spanish films
Spanish transition to democracy
Spanish satirical films
Films about Francisco Franco
Films set in Madrid
Films set in 1978
Resurrection in film